Jaanus Orgulas (5 July 1927 Vaivara – 13 August 2011 Tallinn) was an Estonian actor.

In 1953 he graduated from Lunacharsky State Institute for Theatre Arts' (GITIS) Estonian Studio. 1953-1966 and 1972-2006 he worked at Estonian Drama Theatre, and 1966–1972 at State Philharmonic Society (nowadays Eesti Kontsert).

Selected filmography

 1959 "Vallatud kurvid" (feature film; role: ?)
 1960 "Vihmas ja päikeses" (feature film; role: ?)
 1961 "Ohtlikud kurvid" (feature film; role: ?)

References

1927 births
2001 deaths
Estonian male stage actors
Estonian male film actors
Estonian male television actors
Estonian male radio actors
20th-century Estonian male actors
Recipients of the Order of the White Star, 5th Class
People from Narva-Jõesuu